Ludo Janssens (born 19 April 1942 in Antwerp) is a Belgian former road cyclist. Professional from 1961 to 1965, he notably won the 1962 Brabantse Pijl, in addition several other larger one day races. He also competed in the 1963 Tour de France, finishing 39th overall.

Major results

1961
 1st Druivenkoers-Overijse
 5th Paris–Tours
1962
 1st Brabantse Pijl
 1st Nationale Sluitingprijs
 6th Overall Vuelta Ciclista a la Comunidad Valenciana
1st Stage 4
1963
 2nd Omloop Het Volk
1964
 2nd Schaal Sels
 3rd GP Flandria
 5th Grand Prix des Nations
 7th GP de Belgique
 9th Overall Tour du Nord
1965
 1st Grand Prix de Denain
 8th Omloop Het Volk

References

External links
 

1942 births
Living people
Belgian male cyclists
Cyclists from Antwerp
20th-century Belgian people